Maria Clara Giai Pron (born 31 July 1992) is an Italian slalom canoeist who has competed at the international level since 2007.

Giai Pron is an athlete of the Gruppo Sportivo della Marina Militare,

Biography
She competed in the K1 event at the 2012 Summer Olympics where she qualified for the semifinal after an impressive 3rd place in the heats. However, she failed to qualify for the final after missing a gate in the semifinal, finishing 15th overall in the competition.

She is the younger sister of five-time Olympian and world championship medalist Cristina Giai Pron.

References

Italian female canoeists
1992 births
Living people
Olympic canoeists of Italy
Canoeists at the 2012 Summer Olympics
Canoeists of Marina Militare